Ryan Hayes may refer to:
Ryan Hayes (ice hockey)
Ryan Hayes (American football)
Ryan Hayes, musician of Midas Whale
Ryan Hayes, main character in TV series Special